Lobalgidae is a family of mites belonging to the order Sarcoptiformes.

Genera:
 Coendalges Fain & Mendez, 1979
 Echimytricalges Fain, 1970
 Lobalges Fonseca, 1954

References 

Acari